União Esportiva was a Brazilian football club based in Belém, Pará state. They won the Campeonato Paraense twice.

History
The club was founded on August 15, 1906. União Esportiva won the Campeonato Paraense in 1908 and in 1910. The club folded in 1967.

Achievements

 Campeonato Paraense:
 Winners (1): 1908, 1910

Stadium

União Esportiva played their home games at Baenão. The stadium has a maximum capacity of 17,518 people.

References

Association football clubs established in 1906
Association football clubs disestablished in 1967
Defunct football clubs in Pará
1906 establishments in Brazil
1967 disestablishments in Brazil